Appenzell Ausserrhoden, in English sometimes Appenzell Outer Rhodes, is one of the 26 cantons forming the Swiss Confederation. It is composed of twenty municipalities. The seat of the government and parliament is Herisau, and the seat of judicial authorities are in Trogen. It is traditionally considered a "half-canton", the other half being Appenzell Innerrhoden.

Appenzell Ausserrhoden is located in the north east of Switzerland. Together with the canton of Appenzell Innerrhoden, it forms an enclave within the canton of St. Gallen. The canton is essentially located in the Alpine foothills of the Alpstein massif, culminating at the Säntis.

Appenzell Ausserrhoden was part of the historical canton of Appenzell, which was divided into Appenzell Innerrhoden (Catholic) and Appenzell Ausserrhoden (Protestant) in 1597 as a result of the Swiss Reformation.

History
Settlement in Appenzell started in the 7th and the 8th century alongside the river Glatt. The monastery of St. Gallen was of great influence on the local population. In 907 Herisau is mentioned for the first time, the canton (Appenzell: abbatis cella) is named first in 1071.

Foundation
The name Appenzell means "cell (i.e. estate) of the abbot". This refers to the Abbey of St. Gall, which exerted a great influence on the area. By the middle of the 11th century the abbots of St Gall had established their power in the land later called Appenzell, which, too, became thoroughly teutonized, its early inhabitants having probably been romanized Raetians.

By about 1360, conflicts over grazing rights, taxes, and tithes were causing concern for both the abbot and the farmers of Appenzell. Both parties wanted to protect their rights and interests by joining the new Swabian League. In 1377 Appenzell was allowed to join the League with the support of the cities of Konstanz and St. Gallen (the city of St. Gallen was often at odds with the neighboring Abbey of St. Gall). With the support of League, Appenzell refused to pay many of the gifts and tithes that the Abbot Kuno von Stoffeln demanded. In response to the loss of revenue from his estates, Kuno approached the Austrian House of Habsburg for help. In 1392 he made an agreement with the Habsburgs, which was renewed in 1402. In response, in 1401 Appenzell entered into an alliance with the city of St. Gallen to protect their rights and freedom.

Independence and joining the Swiss Confederation

Following increasing conflicts between the Appenzellers the abbot's agents, including the bailiff of Appenzell demanding that a dead body be dug up because he wanted the man's clothes, the Appenzellers planned an uprising. On a certain day, throughout the abbot's lands, they attacked the bailiffs and drove them out of the land. Following unsuccessful negotiations Appenzell and St. Gallen entered into a treaty. The treaty between St. Gallen and Appenzell marked a break between the abbot and his estates. Perhaps fearing the Habsburgs, in 1402 the League expelled Appenzell. During the same year, St. Gallen reached an agreement with the abbot and Appenzell could no longer count on St. Gallen's support. Appenzell declared itself ready to stand against the abbot, and in 1403 formed an alliance with the canton of Schwyz, a member of the Old Swiss Confederation that had defeated the Austrians in the previous century. Glarus provided less support, but authorized any citizen who wished to support Appenzell to do so. In response, the League raised an army and marched to St. Gallen before heading toward Appenzell. On 15 May 1403, they entered the pass to Speicher and outside the village of Vögelinsegg met the Appenzell army. A small force of Appenzell and Confederation troops defeated the League army and signed a short lived peace treaty.

Following another Appenzell victory on 17 June 1405, at Stoss Pass on the border of Appenzell town, the new canton continued to expand. During the expansion, Appenzell had even captured the abbot of St Gall and in response they were excommunicated by the Bishop of Constance.

However, while the Bund expanded the Austrians used the peace to regain their strength. On 11 September 1406 an association of nobles formed a knightly order known as the Sankt Jörgenschild (Order of St. George's Shield) to oppose the rebellious commoners of the Bund. Following a defeat at Bregenz, Appenzell was unable to hold the Bund together. The city of St. Gallen and the canton of Schwyz each paid off the Austrians to avoid an attack, and the Bund was dissolved by King Rupert on 4 April 1408.

As part of the peace treaty, the abbot gave up his ownership of Appenzell, but was still owed certain taxes. However, it wasn't until 1410 that the area was at peace.

In 1411 Appenzell signed a defensive treaty with the entire Swiss Confederation (except Bern), which strengthened their position against the abbot. Appenzell joined the Confederation as an "Associate Member", and did not become a full member until 1513. Following another battle, in 1429, Appenzell was granted freedom from the obligations in the future. This treaty represented the end of Appenzell's last financial tie to the Abbey of St. Gall, and a movement to closer relationships with the Confederation.

Division of Appenzell
Starting in 1522, followers of Martin Luther and Huldrych Zwingli began to preach the Protestant Reformation in Appenzell. The early reformers had the most success in the outer Rhoden, a term that in the singular is said to mean a "clearing," and occurs in 1070, long before the final separation. Following the initial small success, in 1523 Joachim von Watt (also known as Joachim Vadian) began to preach the reformed version of the Acts of the Apostles to friends and fellow clergy. His preaching brought the Reformation into the forefront of public debate. In October 1523, the Council supported the Protestant principle of scriptural sermons and on 24 April 1524 Landsgemeinde confirmed the Cantonal Council's decision. However, the work of the Anabaptists in the Appenzell region (as well as in Zurich and St. Gallen) in 1525 led to government crackdowns. The first police action against the Anabaptists took place in June 1525, followed by the Anabaptist Disputation in Teufen in October 1529.

To end the confrontation between the old and new faiths, the Landesgemeinde decided in April 1525, that each parish should choose a faith, but that the principle of free movement would be supported, so that the religious minority could attend the church of their choice regardless of where they lived. The entire Ausserrhoden (except Herisau, where Joseph Forrester convinced them to remain Catholic until the late 16th century) converted to the Reformation in 1529. The Innerrhoden (except for Gais which joined Ausserrhoden in 1597) remained with the old faith. While the majority of the residents of Appenzell town remained Catholic under Pastor Diepolt Huter, there was a strong Reformed minority. In 1531, the minority were nearly successful in getting the town to ally with the Protestant Ausserrhoden. But an armed mob of angry residents from the neighboring village of Gonten prevented the abolition of the Mass in Appenzell. The Catholic victory in the Second War of Kappel in 1531 ended plans for a reformation of the entire canton of Appenzell.

Two small monasteries (Wonnenstein in Teufen and Grimmenstein in Walzenhausen) in Ausserrhoden remained catholic though the towns around them adopted the new faith. In 1870 the monastery grounds were declared exclaves of the canton Appenzell Innerrhoden by the federal government.

After the Second War of Kappel, the two religions reached a generally peaceful parity. They remained united by common business interests, the same political and legal understanding, a shared desire to form an alliance with France and a shared opposition to the city of St. Gallen. This shared opposition to St. Gallen was demonstrated in the so-called linen affairs (1535–42, 1579), where the weavers throughout Appenzell supported each other when they felt that they were unfairly treated by the linen industry of St. Gallen.

After this time, the term Kanton Appenzell continued to refer to both half-cantons, although this usage has since become outdated. Usually die beiden Appenzell ("the two Appenzells") are spoken of in a political context, and Appenzellerland in a geographic context, if the aim is to refer to Innerrhoden and Ausserrhoden collectively.

From 1798 to 1803 Appenzell, with the other domains of the abbot of St Gall, was formed into the canton of Säntis of the Helvetic Republic, but in 1803, on the creation of the new canton of St Gall, shrank back within its former boundaries.

Early Modern Appenzell

From the 16th century onwards linen production was established little by little. Larger textile businesses established themselves, later diversifying into weaving and embroidery. The textile industry collapsed between 1920 and 1939. In 1834 for the first time a constitution was adapted, undergoing reforms in 1876 and 1908. The construction of numerous railway lines between 1875 and 1913 helped the local industry and the population grew to a maximum of 57,973 people in 1910 (compared with 53,200 in 2001). In 1934 Johannes Baumann was the first citizen from Appenzell Ausserrhoden to become a federal councilor. Women's right to vote was introduced in 1972 on a local level, but only in 1989 on a canton-wide level. In 1994 for the first time two women were elected into government. The open assembly (Landsgemeinde) was abolished in 1997. The Landsgemeinde still convenes in Appenzell Inerrhoden. The right of foreigners to vote is determined by each municipality.

Municipalities
The 20 municipalities (Einwohnergemeinden) are:

Bühler
Gais
Grub
Heiden
Herisau
Hundwil
Lutzenberg
Rehetobel
Reute
Schönengrund
Schwellbrunn
Speicher
Stein
Teufen
Trogen
Urnäsch
Wald
Waldstatt
Walzenhausen
Wolfhalden

Demographics
, the population included 6,959 foreigners, or about 13.22% of the total population. Due to the split of Appenzell, the majority of the population is Protestant (51%) with a Roman Catholic minority (31%).

Historical population 
The historical population is given in the following table:

Politics

Federal election results

 FDP before 2009, FDP.The Liberals after 2009
 "*" indicates that the party was not on the ballot in this canton.
 No election held

See also
List of castles and fortresses in Switzerland

References

External links

Appenzell (AR) Tourism

 
Cantons of Switzerland